Paul Venables (born 3 February 1962) is a British actor who has appeared in film, television and theatre.

Venables grew up in Devon and then trained as an actor at the Central School of Speech and Drama. His breakthrough role was as Jamie Callender in the BBC TV series May to December. Additionally, he has had television roles in Wycliffe, Midsomer Murders, Blue Murder, Revelations, Silent Witness, Lewis, and Holby City as board member Toby Carr. Venables has played leading roles for the Royal Shakespeare Company as well as in the West End.

He is married to author Rachel Joyce, and lives in Gloucestershire with his wife and four children.

Filmography
The Princess Academy (1987) – Justin
Stanley's Dragon (1994) – Henry Driver
The House of Mirth (2000) – Jack Stepney
Skyfall (2012) – Inquiry Member No. 1

References

External links

English male stage actors
English male television actors
Living people
Alumni of the Royal Central School of Speech and Drama
Male actors from Devon
1961 births